1979–80 was the 33rd season of the Western International Hockey League.

Standings

 Spokane Flyers			55		35	18	 2				290	201		.636
 Trail Smoke Eaters		51		30	18	 3				284	206		.617
 Cranbrook Royals		51		30	21	 0				292	238		.588
 Kimberley Dynamiters		51		28	23	 0				260	256		.551
 Elk Valley Blazers		51		15	33	 3				183	298		.313
 Nelson Maple Leafs 		51		11	37	 3				200	287		.212

Playoffs

Semi finals

Best of 7

 Cranbrook Royals defeated Trail Smoke Eaters 4 games to 2 (3-6, 8-6, 0-8, 7-3, 6-4, 9-4)
 Spokane Flyers defeated Kimberley Dynamiters 4 games to 1 (4-0, 5-4, 3-4 OT, 4-2, 4-3)

Final
In the "best of 7" final, Spokane Flyers defeated Cranbrook Royals 4 games to 2 (6-5 2OT, 3-7, 8-1, 2-7, 7-2, 6-1) to advanced to the 1979-80 British Columbia Senior Playoffs.

References 

Western International Hockey League seasons
WIHL
WIHL